WRDV is a U.S. public radio station serving some northern suburbs of the Philadelphia, Pennsylvania area. The radio station studio is located in Hatboro and the broadcast tower in Warminster. WRDV's program hosts are volunteers who frequently play their own album collections on the air.

Programming
Music selection varies widely by host.  Some of the music includes blues, country, jazz, 1920s and 1930s big band, doo-wop, A cappella, soul, Rhythm and Blues, beautiful music and polka.

History
WRDV began broadcasting on Sept 6, 1976 as WCSD, a 10-watt radio station located at the former William Tennent High School on Street Road. Its call letters are the initials of the station's original owner, the Centennial School District. In 1980 the station license was transferred from the School District to the Bux-Mont Educational Radio Association and the station relocated to the basement of the Warminster Township Building/Police Department at Henry and Gibson Avenues in Warminster, Pennsylvania.  It began operations there on May 15, 1980, after a 16-month period of silence. In 1981 it increased power to 200 watts and in 1986 changed call letters to WRDV which stand for "Radio in the Delaware Valley." In 1987 WRDV began the "Delaware Valley Radio Network" by simulcasting on a translator in Sellersville/Quakertown at 88.7 and, in 1988, adding a translator at 91.9 FM in Lawrenceville/Trenton.

Also in the late eighties, several members of the station management launched sister station WDVR 89.7 FM, which is now located in Sergeantsville, New Jersey.

In the nineties, 89.3 WRDV increased power to 1000 watts and WRDV's 91.9 relay was reassigned to relay WDVR in Princeton. The Sellersville transmitter was closed and the FCC cancelled its license in 1998. WRDV later added 10-Watt translator relay W297AD at 107.3 in Philadelphia and 84 watt relay W300AA at 107.9 FM in Bensalem, PA. In the late nineties WRDV relocated its studios to Hatboro, Pennsylvania and began simulcasting WRDV programming on co-owned WLBS in Bristol, PA at 100-watts at 91.7 FM. On May 25, 2004, WRDV changed the Bensalem frequency to 97.1 FM, with calls
of W246AR. Today WRDV operates with 1600 watts of power from its Warminster transmitter site where its transmitter has operated since 1980.

See also
List of community radio stations in the United States

References
Sellersville Translator and License: http://www.fcc.gov/Bureaus/Mass_Media/Public_Notices/Brdcst_Actions/ac990507.txt

Levittown Relay: 
http://www.bostonradio.org/nerw/nerw-020617.html

WRDV Power increase, WLBS, Philadelphia Relay:
http://paradio.tripod.com/philadfm.htm

WDVR-FM, 91.9 FM relay:
http://www.wdvrfm.org/

External links
WRDV website
Listen online

RDV
Community radio stations in the United States